The 1920–21 FA Cup was the 46th season of the world's oldest association football competition, the Football Association Challenge Cup (more usually known as the FA Cup). Tottenham Hotspur won the competition, beating Wolverhampton Wanderers 1–0 in the final at Stamford Bridge, London.

Matches were scheduled to be played at the stadium of the team named first on the date specified for each round, which was always a Saturday. If scores were level after 90 minutes had been played, a replay would take place at the stadium of the second-named team later the same week. If the replayed match was drawn further replays would be held at neutral venues until a winner was determined. If scores were level after 90 minutes had been played in a replay, a 30-minute period of extra time would be played.

Calendar
The format of the FA Cup for the season had two preliminary rounds, six qualifying rounds, four proper rounds, and the semi-finals and final.

First round proper
52 of the 66 clubs from the First, Second and Third divisions joined the 12 clubs who came through the qualifying rounds.

Of those sides not receiving a bye to the first round proper, Second Division side Leeds United were entered at the first qualifying round stage, as their promotion to the second tier was agreed by election, rather than through promotion. However, the match was not played, and Harrogate were given a walkover. Three sides from the Third Division (Merthyr Town, Newport County and Gillingham) were entered at the fourth qualifying round. Six Third Division and four Second Division sides were entered at the sixth qualifying round stage. These were:

Second Division
Clapton Orient
Port Vale
Rotherham County
Coventry City

Third Division
Swansea Town
Luton Town
Bristol Rovers
Grimsby Town
Southend United
Northampton Town

Of these, all of the Third Division sides and Clapton Orient proceeded to the first round proper, in addition to five non-league sides. 32 matches were scheduled to be played on Saturday, 8 January 1921. Six matches were drawn and went to replays in the following midweek fixture, of which one went to another replay.

Second round proper
The 16 second round matches were played on Saturday, 29 January 1921. Five matches were drawn, with replays taking place in the following midweek fixture.

Third round proper
The eight third round matches were scheduled for Saturday, 19 February 1921. One match was drawn and went to a replay in the following midweek fixture. This was also drawn, and so a second replay was played the following week.

Fourth round proper
The four fourth round matches were scheduled for Saturday, 5 March 1921. There was one replay, between Hull City and Preston North End, played in the following midweek fixture.

Semi-finals

The semi-final matches were played on Saturday, 19 March 1921. The Wolverhampton Wanderers–Cardiff City match was drawn and went to a replay four days later. Wolves won this, and went on to meet Tottenham Hotspur in the final.

Replay

Final

The Final was contested by Tottenham Hotspur and Wolverhampton Wanderers at Stamford Bridge. Spurs won by a single goal, scored by Jimmy Dimmock, eight minutes into the second half. The cup was presented to the winning team by King George V.

Match details

See also
FA Cup Final Results 1872-

References
General
Official site; fixtures and results service at TheFA.com
1920-21 FA Cup at rsssf.com
1920-21 FA Cup at soccerbase.com

Specific

 
FA Cup seasons
FA
Cup